The Anatoly Stepanov Stadium is a 15,000-capacity Motorcycle speedway and Ice speedway in Tolyatti, Russia.

History
The stadium opened in 1963 and is the home of the Russian speedway team called the Mega Lada Togliatti. In 2019, the stadium hosted the 2019 Speedway of Nations (the World Cup of speedway). In 2021, the stadium hosted the Speedway World Championship round known as the Speedway Grand Prix of Russia in 2021 and was due to be a regular venue until the 2022 Russian invasion of Ukraine. The speedway track has a circumference of 353 metres.

Name
The stadium is named after the deputy of the Duma of Samara Oblast and president of the sports club Mega-Lada Anatoly Alexeyevich Stepanov, who was murdered in 2009.

See also 
Speedway Grand Prix of Russia

References

Sport in Tolyatti
Buildings and structures in Tolyatti
Sports venues completed in 1963